Turbulence is the second and last album by rock band Aviator.

Track listing
All tracks composed by Aviator; except where indicated
 "Way of the World" (4:53)
 "The American" (4:40)
 "Turbulence" (6:44)
 "Ovation" (4:54)
 "Fallen Star" (7:22)
 "Track Eleven" (1:33)
 "Get Your Rocks Off" (Bob Dylan) (5:01)
 "Strange Worlds" (7:01)

Personnel
Aviator 
Mick Rogers - guitar, lead vocals
John G. Perry - bass, vocals, pedal keyboard
Clive Bunker- drums, percussion, vocals
with:
Betsy Cook, Vivienne McAuliffe, Carol Stocker - backing vocals
Technical
Mike Hedges - engineer
Martyn Webster - engineer
David Kemp - engineer
Mark Lawrence - photography
Wil Malone - producer

References

Aviator (British band) albums
1980 albums
Albums with cover art by Roger Dean (artist)
Harvest Records albums
albums recorded at Morgan Sound Studios